Wolfe von Lenkiewicz is a British artist known for his artistic reconfigurations of well-known imageries from art history and visual culture to create ambiguous compositions that question art historical discourses. He lives and works in London.

Early life and education
Wolfe von Lenkiewicz was born in Dartmoor, England, in October 1966 to Celia Norman and the British painter Robert Lenkiewicz. He is of German-Polish-Jewish descent, with his great-grandfather being Baron von Schlossberg, court painter to King Ludwig II of Bavaria. Lenkiewicz was educated at University of York, graduating in 1989 with a degree in Philosophy.
Lenkiewicz studied contemporary epistemology under Marie McGinn, who is now the emeritus professor of philosophy York university. He was also tutored by Roger Woolhouse on John Locke.

Artistic career

In the East End of London in 2002, Lenkiewicz founded T1+2 Art Space which he directed and curated as an independent artist run project for six years. The inaugural show being in Wheeler Street with Gustav Metzger titled, "100,000 Newspapers", a public active installation. Lenkiewicz also collaborated with Metzger on a conference titled, "World's First Congress of Fork Lift Trucks" at the Truman brewery. Invited were speakers Norman Rosenthal, directors of the Serpentine Gallery and curators including Hans Ulrich Obrist. 
Other notable shows included the Viennese Actionist Otto Muehl who were invited to exhibit paintings and films as well as contributing to talks. Artists shown at T1+2 read as a list of names from most of the generation that followed the YBAs in the East End.

Lenkiewicz exhibited 33 drawings including 3 large-scale works at his first major exhibition, Nu-Trinity, at Dickinson in 2007. Richard Dyer described the exhibition as 'an iconographic investigation into the power inherent in certain images and events, and the mythos associated with them'. Lenkiewicz’s works have since then been exhibited internationally, including Tate Britain and All Visual Arts in London, Palais des Beaux-Arts in Lille, as well as in Dublin, Hamburg, Berlin and Venice.

Lenkiewicz was represented by All Visual Arts Gallery directed by Joe la Placa. He painted in a 19th century Roman studio for several months and completed a life size reinterpretation of Théodore Géricault's Raft of the Medusa. After having left Italy, the monumental painting was exhibited at the London gallery AVA with the support of Michael Platt of BlueCrest Capital Management. 
In 2009, Lenkiewicz's solo exhibition titled The Descent of Man exhibited over 80 works in a former landmark bank building built originally by Arthur Beresford Pite in London. The space was sponsored by IVG Immobilien property group in order to enable the artist to work on a large scale with the relevant real estate and wall space for three years. Lenkiewicz then moved to a large studio in Grosvenor Place, Belgravia from 2016 until 2019, which was sponsored by Hammer Holdings where Lenkiewicz’s The School of Night was painted.

Lenkiewicz's works primarily deal with the appropriation of language and mythology by juxtaposing elements such as religious figures, pop culture icons, literary characters and motifs. Lenkiewicz's drawings and paintings often reference iconic imageries, including those by Albrecht Dürer, Pablo Picasso, Andy Warhol, and Hieronymus Bosch. Lenkiewicz transforms Dürer's Self-Portrait (1500) in his Werewolf (2011), referencing Jacques Derrida's The Beast and the Sovereign.

His most recent solo exhibition, The School of Night, was held at the Saatchi Gallery in 2018, featuring several paintings and drawings, with the highlight being a vast 9 x 4 metre canvas. 
https://www.saatchigallery.com/exhibition/wolfe_von_lenkiewicz__the_school_of_night

Exhibitions

Upcoming exhibitions include Cranach: Artist and Innovator, a group exhibition to be shown at Compton Verney, March 2020. Lenkiewicz will also show at the Nationalmuseum, Stockholm in February 2020 and the renowned Ateneum Museum, Finland in June 2020.

Solo exhibitions

Selected group exhibitions

Upcoming exhibitions

References

External links
 Wolfe von Lenkiewicz

1966 births
Living people
English artists
English contemporary artists
Alumni of the University of York